This is a list of members of the Victorian Legislative Council from the elections of 8 September 1898 to the elections of 13 September 1900.

From 1889 there were fourteen Provinces and a total of 48 members.

Note the "Term in Office" refers to that members term(s) in the Council, not necessarily for that Province.

William Zeal was President of the Council.

 Connor died 24 June 1899; replaced by Thomas Harwood sworn-in July 1899.
 Sargeant resigned in October 1898; replaced by Joseph Hoddinott, sworn-in November 1898.
 Service died 12 April 1899; replaced by John Mark Davies, sworn-in June 1899.

References

 Re-member (a database of all Victorian MPs since 1851).

Members of the Parliament of Victoria by term
19th-century Australian politicians